The Women's moguls event in freestyle skiing at the 2018 Winter Olympics took place at the Bogwang Phoenix Park, Pyeongchang, South Korea from 9 to 11 February 2018. It was won by Perrine Laffont, with Justine Dufour-Lapointe taking silver and Yuliya Galysheva taking bronze. For Laffont and Galysheva these were first Olympic medals. Galysheva also won the first ever medal in Kazakhstan in freestyle skiing.

The field included the defending champion, Justine Dufour-Lapointe, and the 2014 silver medalist and her sister, Chloé Dufour-Lapointe. Both advanced to Final 1, but only Justine advanced further to Final 2 (and eventually to Final 3). With Andi Naude, who had the highest total score in Final 2, skiing off the course, and Britteny Cox and Jakara Anthony posting total scores well below their performance in Final 2, Galysheva, Dufour-Lapointe, and Laffont consecutively came to the lead and took the podium.

In the victory ceremony, the medals were presented by Tony Estanguet, member of the International Olympic Committee accompanied by Michel Vion, FIS council member.

Qualification

The top 30 athletes in the Olympic quota allocation list qualified, with a maximum of four athletes per National Olympic Committee (NOC) allowed. All athletes qualifying must also have placed in the top 30 of a FIS World Cup event or the FIS Freestyle Ski and Snowboarding World Championships 2017 during the qualification period (July 1, 2016 to January 21, 2018) and also have a minimum of 80 FIS points to compete. If the host country, South Korea at the 2018 Winter Olympics did not qualify, their chosen athlete would displace the last qualified athlete, granted all qualification criterion was met.

Results

Qualification
In the first qualifying round, the ten best athletes directly qualified for the final. Others competed in the second qualification round.

Qualifying 1
 QF — Qualified directly for the final
 QS — Qualified for the semifinal
 Bib — Bib number
 DNF — Did not finish
 DNS — Did not start

Qualifying 2
 QF — Qualified for the final
 Bib — Bib number
 DNF — Did not finish
 DNS — Did not start

Final

Final 1
In the first final round, the 12 best athletes qualified for the second final round.

 Q — Qualified for next round

Final 2
In the second final round, the six best athletes qualified for the third final round.

 Q — Qualified for next round

Final 3
The third final round determined the medalists.

References

Women's freestyle skiing at the 2018 Winter Olympics